Frederik August Albrecht Schram (born 19 January 1995) is a professional footballer who plays for as a goalkeeper for Icelandic club Valur. Born in Denmark, he represents the Iceland national team internationally.

Club career
Frederik is a product of Danish Dragør Boldklub and as a teenager Odense Boldklub youth academy.

In May 2019, Schram left FC Roskilde and joined SønderjyskE on a contract for the rest of 2019. One month after his arrival, Schram was loaned out to Lyngby Boldklub for the rest of 2019. However, his contract was not extended by the end of the year and he left the club, becoming a free agent.

On 14 January 2020, Schram made a permanent transfer to Lyngby BK, signing a six-month contract. He suffered relegation to the Danish 1st Division with the club on 9 May 2021 after a loss to last placed AC Horsens. On 24 June 2022 it was confirmed, that Schram had signed with Icelandic giants Valur, he signed a two-year contract running until the end of 2024.

International career
Schram was born in Denmark to a Danish father and an Icelandic mother. Frederik represented Iceland in the youth international level and was called up to the senior national team in November 2015 for matches against Poland and Slovakia, but did not make a debut. He made his first international appearance on 9 February 2017 in a friendly match against Mexico.

In May 2018 he was named in Iceland's 23-man squad for the 2018 World Cup in Russia.

Career statistics

Club

International

References

External links

1995 births
Living people
People from Dragør Municipality
Frederik Schram
Icelandic people of Danish descent
People with acquired Icelandic citizenship
Frederik Schram
Danish men's footballers
Association football goalkeepers
Frederik Schram
Frederik Schram
2018 FIFA World Cup players
Danish Superliga players
Danish 1st Division players
FC Roskilde players
FC Vestsjælland players
SønderjyskE Fodbold players
Lyngby Boldklub players
Sportspeople from the Capital Region of Denmark